An aeolipile, aeolipyle, or eolipile, from the Greek "αιολουπυλη", also known as a Hero's engine, is a simple, bladeless radial steam turbine which spins when the central water container is heated. Torque is produced by steam jets exiting the turbine. The Greek-Egyptian mathematician and engineer Hero of Alexandria described the device in the 1st century AD, and many sources give him the credit for its invention. However, Vitruvius was the first to describe this appliance in his De architectura (ca. 30–20 BC).

The aeolipile is considered to be the first recorded steam engine or reaction steam turbine, but it is neither a practical source of power nor a direct predecessor of the type of steam engine invented during the Industrial Revolution.

The name – derived from the Greek word Αἴολος and Latin word pila – translates to "the ball of Aeolus", Aeolus being the Greek god of the air and wind.

Physics

The aeolipile usually consists of a spherical or cylindrical vessel with oppositely bent or curved nozzles projecting outwards. It is designed to rotate on its axis. When the vessel is pressurised with steam, the gas is expelled out of the nozzles, which generates thrust due to the rocket principle as a consequence of the 2nd and 3rd of Newton's laws of motion. When the nozzles, pointing in different directions, produce forces along different lines of action perpendicular to the axis of the bearings, the thrusts combine to result in a rotational moment (mechanical couple), or torque, causing the vessel to spin about its axis. Aerodynamic drag and frictional forces in the bearings build up quickly with increasing rotational speed (rpm) and consume the accelerating torque, eventually cancelling it and achieving a steady state speed.

Typically, and as Hero described the device, the water is heated in a simple boiler which forms part of a stand for the rotating vessel. Where this is the case, the boiler is connected to the rotating chamber by a pair of pipes that also serve as the pivots for the chamber. Alternatively the rotating chamber may itself serve as the boiler, and this arrangement greatly simplifies the pivot/bearing arrangements, as they then do not need to pass steam. This can be seen in the illustration of a classroom model shown here.

History

Both Hero and Vitruvius draw on the much earlier work by Ctesibius (285–222 BC), also known as Ktēsíbios or Tesibius, who was an inventor and mathematician in Alexandria, Ptolemaic Egypt. He wrote the first treatises on the science of compressed air and its uses in pumps.

Vitruvius's description
Vitruvius (c. 80 BC – c. 15 BC) mentions aeolipiles by name:

Hero's description
Hero (c. 10–70 AD) takes a more practical approach, in that he gives instructions how to make one:

Practical usage

It is not known whether the aeolipile was put to any practical use in ancient times, and if it was seen as a pragmatic device, a whimsical novelty, an object of reverence, or some other thing. A source described it as a mere curiosity for the ancient Greeks, or a "party trick". Hero's drawing shows a standalone device, and was presumably intended as a "temple wonder", like many of the other devices described in Pneumatica.

Vitruvius, on the other hand, mentions use of the aeolipile for demonstrating the physical properties of the weather. He describes them as:

After describing the device's construction (see above) he concludes:

In 1543, Blasco de Garay, a scientist and a captain in the Spanish navy, allegedly demonstrated before the Holy Roman Emperor, Charles V and a committee of high officials an invention he claimed could propel large ships in the absence of wind using an apparatus consisted of copper boiler and moving wheels on either side of the ship. This account was preserved by the royal Spanish archives at Simancas. It is proposed that de Garay used Hero's aeolipile and combined it with the technology used in Roman boats and late medieval galleys. Here, de Garay's invention introduced an innovation where the aeolipile had practical usage, which was to generate motion to the paddlewheels, demonstrating the feasibility of steam-driven boats. This claim was denied by Spanish authorities.

See also

Catherine wheel (firework)
Rocket engine
Segner wheel
Steam engine
 Steam locomotive
Steam rocket
Tip jet

References

Further reading

History of thermodynamics
Steam engines
Rocket engines
Industrial design
Hellenistic engineering
Early rocketry
Ancient inventions
Ancient Egyptian technology
Egyptian inventions
History of technology